The Falkland Islands general election of 2001 was held on Thursday 22 November 2001 to elect members to the Legislative Council through universal suffrage using block voting. Chief Executive Michael Blanch acted as Chief Counting Officer.

The election took place on the same day as the referendum on merging Stanley and the Camp into a single electoral constituency elected by proportional representation.

At the start of the campaign the Democratic Association, one of the only political parties in the history of the Falkland Islands, had suggested it would field as many as eight candidates. However, all candidates in the election stood as nonpartisans. The Democratic Association strongly opposed the 1999 Treaty allowing Argentine Nationals to visit the Falklands.

Election results

Stanley constituency

Camp constituency

Referendum results
The question posed by the referendum was:

Results by constituency

References

2001 elections in South America
General election
2001
2001
Non-partisan elections
2001 referendums
2001 elections in British Overseas Territories
November 2001 events in South America